Osa is a village in Allahabad, Uttar Pradesh, India. It is in the district of PrayagRaj and comes under the tehsil Karchhana. 
According to Census 2011 information the location code or village code of Osa village is 162063. Its PIN code is 212301. Osa village is located in Bara 
Vidhan Sabha of Allahabad district in Uttar Pradesh, India. It is situated 20km away from sub-district headquarter Bara and 40km away from district headquarter Allahabad. As per 2019 stats, Osa village is also a gram panchayat.

The total geographical area of village is 334.92 hectares. Osa has a total population of 1,254 peoples. There are about 191 houses in Osa village. Kaundhiyara is nearest town to Osa which is approximately 5km away.

The village is connected very well to the other nearby places but the problem for public transport system persists.

References

Villages in Allahabad district